Hosoya (written:  or ) is a Japanese surname. Notable people with the surname include:

, Japanese businessman
, Japanese triathlete
, Japanese chemist and professor
Hosoya index
, Japanese baseball player
, Japanese footballer
, Japanese rower
, Japanese voice actor

See also
Hosoya Station (disambiguation), multiple railway stations in Japan

Japanese-language surnames